The 2001 European Junior Canoe Slalom Championships  were the 4th edition of the European Junior Canoe Slalom Championships. The event took place in Bratislava, Slovakia from 6 to 8 July 2001 under the auspices of the European Canoe Association (ECA) at the Čunovo Water Sports Centre. A total of 8 medal events took place.

Medal summary

Men

Canoe

Kayak

Women

Kayak

Medal table

References

External links
European Canoe Association

European Junior and U23 Canoe Slalom Championships
European Junior and U23 Canoe Slalom Championships